M. Awdotja Mikhailova (1746–1807), was a Russian stage actress and opera singer. She belonged to the pioneer group of first professional actors in Russia, and could be regarded as the first opera singer in Russia. She also performed folk songs.

References

1746 births
1807 deaths
18th-century women opera singers from the Russian Empire
18th-century actresses from the Russian Empire